"Heeding the Call" is a song by HammerFall, released as their second single on 3 August 1998. This contains the bonus tracks from the Legacy of Kings, released only on some special copies of the album. It also contains three live recorded songs.The cover artwork was created by Andreas Marschall.

Track listing

Personnel
 Joacim Cans - lead and backing vocals
 Oscar Dronjak - guitars and backing vocals
 Stefan Elmgren - lead guitar
 Magnus Rosén - bass guitar
 Patrik Räfling - drums

Music videos
 "Heeding the Call" - live recorded video

Chart positions

Charts

Release information
Also released as limited edition shaped picture disc.

References

External links
 Official HammerFall website
 Album information
 Single lyrics

1998 singles
HammerFall songs
Songs written by Joacim Cans
Songs written by Oscar Dronjak
Nuclear Blast Records singles
1998 songs
Songs written by Jesper Strömblad